Notre Dame School of Dallas is a Catholic school for children with intellectual disabilities in Uptown Dallas, Texas. It is the only private school in Dallas catering to intellectually disabled children. The target IQ scores are 30–70. Some students have Down syndrome. Its age range is six through 21.

It opened in 1963.  it had 150 students.

The campus is co-located with St. Peter's Church. The school was rebuilt beginning in 2015.

Extracurricular activities
It established a cheer squad circa 2000. Initially 15 pupils were a part of it.

References

External links
 Notre Dame School of Dallas

Private K-12 schools in Dallas
Special schools in the United States
Catholic secondary schools in Texas
1963 establishments in Texas
Educational institutions established in 1963